Santosh Yadav (born 10 October 1967) is an Indian mountaineer. She is the first woman in the world to climb Mount Everest twice and the first woman to successfully climb Mount Everest from Kangshung Face. She climbed the peak first in May 1992 and then again in May 1993 with an Indo-Nepalese Team.

During her Everest mission in 1992, she saved the life of a climber, Mohan Singh, by sharing oxygen with him. She also tried to help a mountaineer who lay dying at the South Col but was unsuccessful in saving him.

Early life and education
She was born in Joniyawas village in Rewari district of Haryana state, India as the sixth child in a family of five boys. She earlier attended a local village school and then moved to Delhi and got enrolled in a school there. She attended Maharani College in Jaipur, where she was able to see mountaineers climbing Aravalli Range from her room. She was inspired by this to join Uttarkashi's Nehru Institute of Mountaineering while successfully continuing her studies for the Indian Administrative Service (IAS) exams in a hostel provided by the Amity University at Noida.

Career
In 1992, Yadav scaled Mount Everest , when she was barely 25, becoming the youngest woman in the world to achieve this feat, a record which was broken by 13-year-old  Purna, in 2013. Within twelve months, she became a member of an Indo-Nepalese Women's expedition and scaled Everest the second time, thus setting the record as the first woman to have scaled Everest twice.  She also remained as an officer in the Indo-Tibetan Border Police. She was a part of the nine-nation international climbing camp-cum-expedition to Nun Kun in 1989. Also, her being a fervent environmentalist, she collected 500 kgs of dumped wastes from the Himalayas.

Santosh Yadav was awarded the National Adventure Award 1994 and Padma Shri in 2000.

Expeditions
In 1999, Santosh Yadav led an Indian mountaineering expedition to Kangshung Face, Everest.
In 2001, she led a mountaineering team to East Face, Mount Everest.

See also
Indian summiters of Mount Everest - Year wise
List of Mount Everest summiters by number of times to the summit
List of Mount Everest records of India
List of Mount Everest records
List of 20th-century summiters of Mount Everest
Dicky Dolma
Malavath Purna

References 

1967 births
Living people
Indian female mountain climbers
Indian mountain climbers
Recipients of the Padma Shri in sports
Recipients of the Tenzing Norgay National Adventure Award
People from Rewari
Sportswomen from Haryana
Indian summiters of Mount Everest
University of Rajasthan alumni
20th-century Indian women
20th-century Indian people
Mountain climbers from Haryana